Ruddington Factory Halt was a railway station opened in 1941 but closed circa 1948. The station was opened to serve a new factory within the Ruddington Ordnance Depot. The site is now occupied by the Nottingham Heritage Railway.

See also
Bombs to Butterflies

References

Disused railway stations in Nottinghamshire
Railway stations in Great Britain opened in 1941
Railway stations in Great Britain closed in 1948
Former London and North Eastern Railway stations